In matroid theory, a Sylvester matroid is a matroid in which every pair of elements belongs to a three-element circuit (a triangle) of the matroid.

Example
The -point line (i.e., the rank 2 uniform matroid on  elements) is a Sylvester matroid because every pair of elements is a basis and every triple is a circuit.

A Sylvester matroid of rank three may be formed from any Steiner triple system, by defining the lines of the matroid to be the triples of the system. Sylvester matroids of rank three may also be formed from Sylvester–Gallai configurations, configurations of points and lines (in non-Euclidean spaces) with no two-point line. For example, the Fano plane and the Hesse configuration give rise to Sylvester matroids with seven and nine elements respectively, and may be interpreted either as Steiner triple systems or as Sylvester–Gallai configurations.

Properties
A Sylvester matroid with rank  must have at least  elements; this bound is tight only for the projective spaces over GF(2), of which the Fano plane is an example.

In a Sylvester matroid, every independent set can be augmented by one more element to form a circuit of the matroid.

Sylvester matroids (other than ) cannot be represented over the real numbers (this is the Sylvester–Gallai theorem), nor can they be oriented.

History
Sylvester matroids were studied and named by  after James Joseph Sylvester, because they violate the Sylvester–Gallai theorem (for points and lines in the Euclidean plane, or in higher-dimensional Euclidean spaces) that for every finite set of points there is a line containing only two of the points.

References

Matroid theory